Silas Lee (July 3, 1760 – March 1, 1814) was a lawyer, judge, and United States Representative from Massachusetts. Born in Concord in the Province of Massachusetts Bay, he pursued classical studies and graduated from Harvard University in 1784. He studied law, was admitted to the bar, and was a member of the Massachusetts House of Representatives in 1793, 1797, and 1798.

Lee was elected as a Federalist to the 6th and 7th Congresses and served from March 4, 1799, until August 20, 1801, when he resigned. He was appointed by President Thomas Jefferson to be United States Attorney for the District of Maine on January 6, 1802, and served until his death; he was justice of the peace and of the quorum in 1803, and probate judge from 1805 to 1814. In 1810 he was chief judge of the Court of Common Pleas. He died in Wiscasset (at the time, a part of Massachusetts' District of Maine). His interment was in Evergreen Cemetery.

References

1760 births
1814 deaths
Harvard University alumni
Members of the Massachusetts House of Representatives
Members of the United States House of Representatives from the District of Maine
United States Attorneys for the District of Maine
Federalist Party members of the United States House of Representatives from Massachusetts